Trausdorf an der Wulka (Burgenland Croatian: Trajštof) is a town in the district of Eisenstadt-Umgebung in the Austrian state of Burgenland.  It is on the Wulka river.

Population

References

Cities and towns in Eisenstadt-Umgebung District